The 1996–97 UEFA Champions League was the 42nd season of UEFA's premier European club football tournament, the fifth since its rebranding as the UEFA Champions League, and the last involving only clubs that were champions of their domestic leagues. Due to the Bosman ruling, restrictions on foreign players in matchday squads were lifted from this season.

The tournament was won by Borussia Dortmund in a 3–1 final victory against defending champions Juventus. It was their only title in the tournament to date, and the first title for Germany since its reunification in 1990.

Teams
24 teams entered the competition: the national champions of each of the top 23 nations in the UEFA coefficient rankings, and UEFA Champions League holders, Juventus. The national champions of the associations ranked 1–7, plus the title holders, all received a bye to the group stage, while the national champions of the associations ranked 8–23 entered in the qualifying round. The remaining national champions from the associations ranked 24–48 were only allowed to participate in UEFA Cup.

Round and draw dates
The schedule of the competition is as follows (all draws are held in Geneva, Switzerland).

Qualifying round

The winners of each tie in the preliminary round entered the Champions League group stage, whilst the losers entered the UEFA Cup first round.

|}

Group stage

Atlético Madrid, Auxerre, Fenerbahçe, Rapid Wien and Widzew Łódź made their debut in the group stage.

Group A

Group B

Group C

Group D

Knockout stage

Bracket

Quarter-finals

|}

Semi-finals

|}

Final

Top goalscorers

See also
 1996 UEFA Intertoto Cup
 1996–97 UEFA Cup
 1996–97 UEFA Cup Winners' Cup

References

External links
1996–97 All matches – season at UEFA website
 European Cup results at RSSSF
 All scorers 1996–97 UEFA Champions League (excluding qualifying round) according to protocols UEFA + all scorers qualifying round
 1996/97 UEFA Champions League – results and line-ups

 
Champions League
1996-97